The Vankor 350 was a NASCAR Gander RV & Outdoors Truck Series race at Texas Motor Speedway. The 1999 race was 300 kilometers and the 2000 race was 400 kilometers, and became 350 kilometers in 2001. The race moved to the spring for the 2019 season.

Past winners

2000: Greg Biffle clinched the 2000 series title in this race; additionally, driver Tony Roper was severely injured in a crash on lap 33, and died the following day, becoming the third NASCAR fatality that year.
2001: Race postponed from September 15 because of the September 11 attacks.
2006, 2007, 2011 & 2014: Race extended because of a green–white–checker finish.
2020: Race postponed from March 27 to July 18 due to the COVID-19 pandemic. Even though the race kept its name, the distance was that of the race run in June, which is 400 kilometers/167 laps.

Multiple winners (drivers)

Multiple winners (teams)

Manufacturer wins

See also
 2011 WinStar World Casino 350K

References

External links
 

Former NASCAR races
NASCAR Truck Series races
 
1999 establishments in Texas
2020 disestablishments in Texas
Recurring sporting events established in 1999
Recurring sporting events disestablished in 2020